Kelly is an unincorporated community in Nemaha County, Kansas, United States.  As of the 2020 census, the population of the community and nearby areas was 27.

History
Kelly had its start by the building of the Kansas City, Wichita and Northwestern Railway through that territory.

A post office was opened in Kelly in 1888, and remained in operation until it was discontinued in 1988.

Demographics

For statistical purposes, the United States Census Bureau has defined this community as a census-designated place (CDP).

Education
The community is served by Nemaha Central USD 115 public school district.

Notable people
 William S. Hill, Former U.S. Representative.

References

Further reading

External links
 Nemaha County maps: Current, Historic, KDOT

Unincorporated communities in Nemaha County, Kansas
Unincorporated communities in Kansas
1888 establishments in Kansas
Populated places established in 1888